Yaghma may refer to:

Yagma, a Turkish tribe which was part of the Kara-Khanid khanate confederation
Heydar Yaghma, Iranian poet
Ghulam Osman Yaghma,Uyghur president